Nicholas Meregali (born 27 May 1994) is a Brazilian submission grappler and Brazilian jiu-jitsu (BJJ) black belt competitor. A multiple time world, Pan, European and Brazilian champion at colored belts, Meregali is a 3x IBJJF black belt World Champion and a 2 x ADCC World medallist.

Career 
Nicholas de Barcellos Meregali was born on 27 May 1994, in Santo Antônio in the Brazilian state of Rio Grande do Sul. Meregali began training when he was 16 years old at the ACJJ academy in Santo Antônio. At 17 he won the CBJJ Brazilian National Championship then joined Alliance Jiu-Jitsu under Mario Reis in Porto Alegre. Considered one of the best coloured belts in the world, Meregali won every IBJJF Jiu-Jitsu Championship at purple belt; he then won at brown belt two double gold world titles making him a five-time world champion. Reis promoted Meregali to black belt after his 2016 world title.

During his first year as black belt Meregali won the 2017 World Jiu-Jitsu Championship by beating division favourite Leandro Lo, one of the greatest BJJ competitors of all time, 2–0 in the final. The next year, Meregali won gold medal in the Super Heavyweight division of the Brazilian National Jiu-Jitsu Championship, submitting his opponent from the back in the final. In 2019, Meregali won the Brazilian national title again and added the open weight class title to earn "double gold." In 2019 he became world champion again in the Super Heavyweight division. 

Before the 2021 World Championship, Meregali left Alliance to join the Dream Art Project. After showing his middle finger to a spectator who was heckling him, Meregali was disqualified from the 2021 World Championship halfway through the ultra-heavyweight semi-final match, before the disqualification, he was considered to be on track to win both gold at his weight division and in Absolute.

At the 2022 World Jiu-Jitsu Championship Meregali won the title for the third time in Absolute and Silver in his division.

In interviews he has described himself as a perfectionist. Meregali has been described as having a "complete game," and he is known for his outstanding guard, especially his innovative use of the De La Riva position, and chokes from the back.

Meregali transitioned to no gi competition in 2022, making his debut against Arnaldo Maidana at Who's Number One and winning by armbar. In preparation for his first attempt at the ADCC world championships, Meregali started training No-Gi at the New Wave Jiu Jitsu academy in Austin, Texas under head coach John Danaher. Meregali won a bronze medal in the under 99kg division of the 2022 ADCC World Championship, losing only to Craig Jones in the semifinal, and won silver in the openweight division, defeating Tye Ruotolo in the semi-final before losing to Yuri Simões in the final. A rematch between Meregali and Jones was then scheduled for February 2023 at Who's Number One but was postponed indefinitely when Jones was unable to compete due to other commitments.

Brazilian Jiu-Jitsu competitive summary 

Main Achievements (Black Belt):
 IBJJF World Champion (2017 / 2019 / 2022)
 CBJJ Brazilian Nationals Champion (2018 / 2019 / 2022)
 BJJ Stars Grand Prix winner (2019)
 Best throw at ADCC World Championship (2022)
 2nd Place IBJJF World Championship (2022)
 2nd Place ADCC  World Championship Absolute (2022)
 3rd Place IBJJF World Championship (2018)
 3rd Place IBJJF Pan American Championship (2017)
 3rd Place ADCC  World Championship  -99KG (2022)

Main Achievements (Coloured Belts):
 IBJJF World Champion (2016 brown, 2015/2014 purple)
 UAEJJF Abu Dhabi Pro winner (2016/2015 brown, 2014 purple)
 IBJJF European Open Champion (2016 brown, 2014 purple)
 IBJJF Pan Champions (2016 brown, 2015/2014 purple)
 CBJJ Brazilian Nationals Champion (2015/2014 purple, 2013 blue)
 2nd Place CBJJ Brazilian Nationals (2013 blue)
 2nd Place IBJJF World Championship (2014 purple)
 2nd Place IBJJF European Open (2016 brown)
 3rd Place IBJJF World Championship (2013 blue)

Notes

References 

Brazilian practitioners of Brazilian jiu-jitsu
Living people
1994 births
People awarded a black belt in Brazilian jiu-jitsu
World Brazilian Jiu-Jitsu Championship medalists